Nice Guys may refer to:

 Nice Guys (film), a 2005 film directed by Joe Eckardt
 The Nice Guys, a 2016 film directed by Shane Black
The Nice Guys, comedy group James Maclurcan
 Nice Guys (album), a 1978 album by the Art Ensemble of Chicago
 "Nice Guys" (song), the second single from We Are Scientists' album Barbara